Vena Sera is the fourth studio album by American rock band Chevelle, released on April 3, 2007, through Epic Records. Many of the tracks on this album were based on material from unreleased songs the band had previously recorded. The term "Vena Sera" is ungrammatical Latin for "vein liquids".

Vena Sera is the first Chevelle album with bassist Dean Bernardini, the brother-in-law of fellow members Pete and Sam Loeffler. It would also be the second and final album produced by Michael "Elvis" Baskette, marking the first time Chevelle maintained the same producer for a second record.

The first single, "Well Enough Alone", was released to radio stations on February 13, 2007, but a CD single would not be available until March 6.

The album debuted at number 12 in the United States with sales of approximately 62,000. This was less than their previous album, This Type of Thinking (Could Do Us In). On May 28, 2020, it was certified gold with sales of over 500,000 units sold.

Composition
Vena Seras genre has been described as alternative metal and hard rock. The working title for "Saturdays" was "Saturdays of Our Youth".

Reception

According to Blake Solomon of AbsolutePunk, "Vena Sera will not stun anyone with its creative approach to rock or metal or alternative music (depending which song you hear or who you ask). But what the album will do is have you coming back more than a few times to engulf yourself in the heavy riffs and manly baritone of Pete Loeffler." Corey Apar writing for AllMusic called the album "good enough, but too much of it simply sounds like rewrites of songs from the band's past." Blabbermouth.net felt that the album "is a showcase for this band's tight, punchy sound, Peter Loeffler's fluid vocals...even if the tunes don't have the staying power of truly great rock music."

Michael Endelman of Entertainment Weekly stated that the album "begins to bore" because of the band's "reliance on a formula — chugging intro, choppy verses, clouds-parting choruses." Johan Wippsson of Melodic described the album as "[the band's] best album so far with a little cleaner and more varied sound." According to Vince Neilstein of MetalSucks, "There are a couple of solid tunes here, but... [the] album... mostly blends together from song to song." Sputnikmusic felt that the album was "[a] significant step in the right direction" and praised the addition of Dean Bernardini on bass, stating that "[he] breathes an astonishing amount of life into...the rhythm section."

Track listing

Personnel
 Pete Loeffler – guitars, vocals
 Sam Loeffler – drums
 Dean Bernardini – bass, drums
 Michael "Elvis" Baskette – producer, mixing
 Ted Jensen – mastering
 Dave Holdredge – engineer
 Jef Moll – digital editing and programmingBonus tracks'
 Jef Moll – coproducer, engineer, editor, and mixer

Charts

Album

Singles

Certifications

References

2007 albums
Albums produced by Michael Baskette
Chevelle (band) albums
Epic Records albums